Matthew Dickens (October 19, 1961 – January 8, 2013) was a writer, producer and director.

Early life
Matthew Dickens was born in an ambulance on a highway on the outskirts of Nancy, France. Matthew’s early training as an actor began at the Duke Ellington School of the Arts in DC, mentored by the late founder, director/choreographer/educator Mike Malone, who he later joined as a company member of the Equity Theater Company at Karamu House in Cleveland, Ohio.  Other notable teachers were Kenneth Daugherty (acting), Glenda Dickerson (acting), Donal Leace (theater history), Tony Booker (voice), and Quay Barnes Truitt (costumes and make-up)

Matthew’s early training as a dancer included classes at The School of the Cleveland Ballet. In New York, he had a short stay at The Ailey School and studied with David Howard, Finis Jhung, and Frank Hatchett. While performing in New York, he met Debbie Allen. The two went on to work together on numerous projects, including A Different World, Fame, Polly, Carrie, and The Academy Awards.

Films

Television
TV appearances include "Fame," guest starring roles on "A Different World", "Quantum Leap," and several commercials. In 1991 Matthew performed in the ABC special “American Dance Honors”, which received an American Emmy Award nomination for the choreography. Matthew appeared on The Debbie Allen Special in 1989 which was nominated for 2 Primetime Emmys and co-starred in the opening number of the 63rd Academy Awards with Jasmine Guy and Steve LaChance.

Stage
Matthew was in the original Broadway cast of Sunset Boulevard starring Glenn Close (and later with Betty Buckley and Elaine Paige) having initially appeared in the original Los Angeles production. Matthew returned to the Broadway company of Miss Saigon directly from the Netherlands production, where he played the role of John entirely in Dutch. Other Broadway credits include playing both Chris and John (at different times) in Miss Saigon, C.C. White in Dreamgirls and Stephen King's Carrie. He also co-starred in the original Australian cast of Smokey Joe's Cafe.

Broadway

Other Theater

Death
Matthew died of prostate cancer on January 8, 2013.

References

External links 
 Matthew Dickens
 The War Zone 3D
 Movies Planet
 Posthope website

1961 births
2013 deaths
American male film actors
American male musical theatre actors